"Someone to Love Me (Naked)" is a song recorded by American singer Mary J. Blige for her tenth studio album My Life II... The Journey Continues (Act 1) (2011). It features guest vocals by American rappers Diddy and Lil Wayne. "Someone to Love Me (Naked)" was written by Blige, Jerry Wonda and Leroy Watson, and was produced by Wonda. The song is a remix of "Someone to Love Me" from Diddy-Dirty Money's debut studio album, Last Train to Paris (2010). It samples "You Roam When You Don’t Get It At Home" performed by The Sweet Inspirations. It was released on March 29, 2011, as the first promotional single from the album.

"Someone to Love Me (Naked)" is a R&B and hip hop soul song. The song peaked at number 28 on the US Hot R&B/Hip-Hop Songs chart. Blige and Lil Wayne performed a rendition of the single at the 2011 Billboard Music Awards on May 22, 2011. The song's accompanying music video was released on April 5, 2011.

Background and composition 
"Someone to Love Me (Naked)" is a R&B and hip-hop soul song, written by Jerry "Wonder" Duplessis and Leroy Watson. It is a remix of a song titled "Someone to Love Me" by Diddy-Dirty Money, from their 2010 album Last Train to Paris. Both the original and remix of "Someone to Love Me" sample "You Roam When You Don’t Get It At Home" performed by The Sweet Inspirations and written by Bettye Crutcher, David Porter and Ronnie Williams. On January 4, 2011, Angie Martinez premiered the new version of "Someone to Love Me" on her radio show. At the time it was dubbed "Someone to Love Me (MJB Naked Mix)." In the remix, Blige takes over the sample vocals. On March 29, 2011, Blige released the remix to digital retailers under the title "Someone to Love Me (Naked)," as the first single from her tenth album, My Life II... The Journey Continues (Act 1).

Promotion
Mary J. Blige and Lil' Wayne performed "Someone to Love Me (Naked)" at the Billboard Music Awards on May 22, 2011.

Music video
Blige filmed a video for "Someone to Love Me (Naked)" with Colin Tilley in 2011. It features appearances from both Diddy and Lil Wayne. She revealed, through social networking site Twitter, that the video would premiere on April 8, 2011. The video for "Someone to Love Me (Naked)" was supposed to premier through the Vevo network on April 4, 2011, however it leaked online a day earlier than planned after the released date was bumped up to April 5, 2011. The television debut for the video aired on April 5, 2011 following BET’s “The Game.” The video spotlights a blonde Mary as she wanders through a disorienting corridor and sings on the edge of a broken bridge, later linking up with Diddy and Lil Wayne as lightning flashes around them.

Track listing 
Digital download
"Someone to Love Me" (featuring Diddy & Lil Wayne) – 3:33

Charts

Weekly charts

Year-end charts

Release history

References

2011 singles
Mary J. Blige songs
Sean Combs songs
Lil Wayne songs
Songs written by Sean Combs
Songs written by Lil Wayne
Songs written by Mary J. Blige
Songs written by Jerry Duplessis
Song recordings produced by Jerry Duplessis
Interscope Records singles
Music videos directed by Colin Tilley